M-294 is a state trunkline highway in Calhoun County in the US state of Michigan. It is one of a handful of highways that was established or realigned as a result of a rationalization process initiated in 1998 during the tenure of Governor John Engler.

Route description
M-294 runs northward along Beadle Lake Road from I-94 at exit 100 north through a commercial area. Past these businesses, the adjoining land is not developed for a short distance, and the roadway runs through some woodlands. North of the intersection with Golden Avenue, the highway passes through a residential neighborhood before terminating at M-96 (Columbia Avenue). The highway lies entirely within Emmett Township just southeast of Battle Creek. The trunkline carries an average annual daily traffic of 6,078 vehicles south, and 5,728 vehicles north, of Golden Avenue according to a traffic survey completed by the Michigan Department of Transportation (MDOT) in 2010. The highway has not been included as a part of the National Highway System, a system of highways important to the nation's economy, defense, and mobility.

History
Beadle Lake Road was transferred to state jurisdiction on October 31, 1998. The new highway was assigned the M-294 designation by MDOT and first included on the 1999 state map. The routing has remained unchanged since.

Major intersections

See also

References

External links

M-294 at Michigan Highways
Rationalization process at Michigan Highways

294
Transportation in Calhoun County, Michigan